This is a list of members of the Victorian Legislative Council between 1970 and 1973. As half of the Legislative Council's terms expired at each triennial election, half of these members were elected at the 1967 state election with terms expiring in 1973, while the other half were elected at the 1970 state election with terms expiring in 1976. A redistribution in 1965 had created the new provinces of Boronia and Templestowe out of the former Southern Province; the full redistribution took effect at the 1970 election.

 Charles Hider was elected at a by-election to fill the remaining three years of Lindsay Thompson's term in Monash Province, which was held on the same day as the 1970 elections.
 Labor candidate Bunna Walsh, who won the Melbourne West Province seat at the 1970 election, was not admitted to the Council due to a conviction 20 years earlier for robbery with violence in the South Melbourne Children's Court. His election was then declared void in September 1970 by the Court of Disputed Returns, and Labor candidate Bon Thomas won the resulting by-election on 24 October 1970.
 In March 1981, Rupert Hamer, Liberal MLC for East Yarra Province, resigned to contest the Legislative Assembly by-election in the seat of Kew. Liberal candidate Haddon Storey won the resulting by-election on 17 April 1971.
 On 20 April 1972, Jack O'Connell, Labor MLC for Melbourne Province, died. Labor candidate Ivan Trayling was elected unopposed at the resulting by-election on 9 June 1972.

Sources
 Re-member (a database of all Victorian MPs since 1851). Parliament of Victoria.

Members of the Parliament of Victoria by term
20th-century Australian politicians